Jauharabad railway station is located in Khushab District, Punjab  Pakistan Jauharabad Railway is a small junction in Sargodha division

See also
 List of railway stations in Pakistan
 Pakistan Railways

References

External links

Railway stations in Punjab, Pakistan
Railway stations on Sangla Hill–Kundian Branch Line